John Charles Shenton (20 January 1862 – 26 January 1900) was an English first-class cricketer active in 1888 who played for Middlesex. He was born in Bethnal Green; died in Harlow.

References

1862 births
1900 deaths
English cricketers
Middlesex cricketers